Hans Tutschku (born 1966) is a German composer.

Born in Weimar, Tutschku has been a member of the Ensemble for Intuitive Music Weimar since 1982. He studied composition of electronic music at the Hochschule für Musik Carl Maria von Weber, Dresden, and since 1989 has participated in several concert cycles of Karlheinz Stockhausen to study the art of the sound direction. He further studied sonology and electroacoustic composition in 1991–92 at the Royal Conservatory of The Hague, the Netherlands.

In 1994 there followed a one-year study residency at IRCAM in Paris. He taught during 1995–1996 as a guest professor of electroacoustic composition in Weimar. In 1996, he participated in composition workshops with Klaus Huber and Brian Ferneyhough. From 1997 until 2001 he taught electroacoustic composition at IRCAM in Paris and from 2001 to 2004 taught at the Conservatory of Montbéliard. In May 2003 he completed a doctorate (Ph.D.) with Jonty Harrison at the University of Birmingham. During the spring term of 2003 he was the Edgar Varèse Guest Professor at the Technical University of Berlin.

Since September 2004, Tutschku has held the position of Professor of Composition and Director of Electroacoustic Studios at Harvard University. During the last few years he has been invited to give master classes in São Paulo, Buenos Aires, Santiago de Chile, Singapore, Budapest, Darmstadt, Florence, Milano and Rome. He is the winner of many international composition competitions including: Bourges, CIMESP São Paulo, Hanns Eisler Prize, Prix Ars Electronica, Prix Noroit, Prix Musica Nova, ZKM Giga-Hertz, CIME ICEM and Klang!. In 2013 he held a fellowship at the Radcliffe Institute for Advanced Study, and in 2014 a stipend from the Japan–U.S. Friendship Commission.

List of works

 1987 – Durchdringung, 2-channel electroacoustic composition, 6:40 min
 1987 – Hommage à Laszlo Moholy-Nagy, 2-channel electroacoustic composition, 10:51 min
 1989 – Sein wirkliches Herz, 2-channel electroacoustic composition, 9:10 min
 1989 – Übergänge, 2-channel electroacoustic composition, 8:50 min
 1991 – Die zerschlagene Stimme, 4-channel electroacoustic composition, 10:14 min CD
 1991 – Drei Traumgesichter, for English horn and electronics, 11:30 min
 1992 – The Metal Voice, for percussion and tape, 11:30 min
 1994 – Nachts, for violoncello, bass clarinet, percussion and electronics, 15:00 min
 1995 – Freibrief für einen Traum, for soprano, flute, cello, percussion and electronics, 12:30 min
 1995 – Sieben Stufen, 4-channel electroacoustic composition, 13:00 min CD
 1996 – ...erinnerung..., 4-channel electroacoustic composition, 10:10 min CD
 1996 – Der unsichtbare Hörturm, open air sound installation
 1996 – Flammenklang Meiningen, 16 hot air balloon engines, dancers, choir, ensemble and electronics, 60:00 min
 1996 – les invisibles, 8-channel electroacoustic composition, 12:30 min CD
 1996 – rapprochement-éloignement, for mezzo-soprano, flute, viola and harp, 10:30 min
 1997 – Verdichtung, for two choirs and electronics, 13:00 min
 1998 – Départs, for soprano, percussion, 10 instruments and electronics, 17:30 min
 1998 – extrémités lointaines, 8-channel electroacoustic composition, 16:24 min CD
 1998 – Lissabon Project, music for the ballet "Lissabon-Projekt"
 1998 – The breath, the air, the light, (Der Atem, die Luft, das Licht) film music for Marco Gastini
 1999 – Das bleierne Klavier, for piano and live-electronics, 12:00 min CD
 1999 – Die Kirche als Klangskulptur, 16-channel sound installation
 1999 – Eikasia, 8-channel electroacoustic composition, 12:15 min CD
 1999 – human–space–factory, 8-channel electroacoustic composition, 11:49 min CD
 1999 – NochDreiSekundenSchwarz, video in collaboration with Kerstin Wagener, ZKM Karlsruhe
 2000 – Epexergasia – Neun Bilder, 4-channel electroacoustic composition, 12:03 min CD
 2000 – résorption-coupure, 4-channel electroacoustic composition, 14:27 min
 2000 – SprachSchlag, for percussion and live-electronics, 14:00 min
 2001 – memory-fragmentation, 8-channel electroacoustic composition, 11:44 min
 2001 – Migration pétrée, 8-channel electroacoustic composition, 13:35 min CD
 2002 – Cito, for French horn, piano and live-electronics
 2002 – La joie ivre, 2-channel electroacoustic composition, 10:24 min CD
 2002 – Trois structures, for Baschet Resonators and live-electronics
 2002 – Vibrations décomposées, 4-channel electroacoustic composition, 5:30 min
 2004 – Cinq espaces du crépuscule, for organ and live-electronics, 20:00 min
 2004 – object – obstacle, 8-channel electroacoustic composition, 12:29 min CD
 2004 – Rituale, 32-channel electroacoustic composition for wave field synthesis (WFS), 15:06 min
 2004 – Rojo, 8-channel electroacoustic composition, 15.06 min CD
 2004 – Similis, 8-channel electroacoustic composition, 13:55 min
 2005 – Die Süsse unserer traurigen Kindheit, Music theater, 80:00 min
 2006 – Salut du Mexique, 2-channel electroacoustic composition, 2:37 min
 2006 – Winternacht, for piano, percussion and live-electronics, 13:00 min CD
 2007 – Dialog für zwei Instrumentalgruppen
 2007 – Distance liquide, 8-channel electroacoustic composition, 13:00 min CD
 2007 – Einst mit dir, for soprano, clarinet, violin and live-electronics, 13:00 min
 2007 – pour B., 2-channel electroacoustic composition, 5:00 min
 2007 – Shore, for oboe and live-electronics, 11:20 min
 2007 – Tell Me! ... a secret ..., interactive sound and video installation
 2007 – Zellen-Linien, for piano and live-electronics, 19:00 min
 2008 – Monochord, 2-channel electroacoustic composition, 12:14 min
 2008 – Zwei Räume, 24-channel electroacoustic composition, 21:00 min CD
 2009 – Ailleurs – Intérieur, sound installation in three parts
 2009 – fragile connections, for violin, French horn and piano
 2009 – Klangwald – Lichtgestein, open-air multimedia composition with sound and light projection
 2009 – Polyvision, for dance, video and ensemble, 40:00 min
 2009 – Terra Infirma, music for a choreography by Larissa Douglas Koch
 2010 – agitated slowness, 24-channel electroacoustic composition, 33.00 min
 2010 – Firmament – schlaflos, 16-channel electroacoustic composition, 20.25 min CD
 2010 – Irrgärten, for two pianos and live-electronics, 24:00 min
 2011 – behind the light, for string quartet and electronics, 15:00 min
 2011 – Klaviersammlung, 16-channel electroacoustic composition, 9:58 min CD
 2012 – clin d’oreille d’Avignon, 8-channel electroacoustic composition, 10:00 min
 2012 – entwurzelt, for six singers and electronics, 16:00 min
 2012 – hommage à Schwitters, interactive sound sculpture
 2012 – one minute for John Cage, for ensemble (as part of the Party Pieces Project), 1:00 min
 2012 – unreal memories, outdoor sound installation for the Carpenter Center for the Visual Arts
 2013 – Still Air 1, for bass clarinet and electronics, 11:30 min
 2013 – under, for flute, oboe, clarinet, two violins, viola, violoncello, percussion, piano and electronics, 14:40 min
 2014 – collaboration, interactive sound sculpture
 2014 – Interlaced 1, for bass clarinet and electronics, 10:15 min
 2014 – Issho ni, 16-channel electroacoustic composition, 31:00 min CD
 2014 – Still Air 2, for oboe and electronics, 11:30 min
 2014 – Still Air 3, for oboe, bass clarinet and electronics, 11:30 min
 2014 – The other side, interactive sound sculptures and photo installation
 2015 – encounter, improvisation with Vijay Iyer (piano) and Hans Tutschku (live-electronics), 29:00 min
 2015 – pressure – divided, for violoncello and 8-channel live-electronics, 18:00 min
 2015 – resonating lines, for violin, violoncello, piano, percussion and electronics, 15:00 min
 2015 – Shadow of bells, for piano and electronics, 23:00 min
 2016 – codification – memory, for soprano, percussion, nine instruments and live-electronics, 22:00 min
 2016 – periods of existence, for ten instruments, 17:30 min
 2016 – Pneuma(tic) Bodies, improvisation with Jill Johnson (dance) and Hans Tutschku (live-electronics)
 2016 – Remembering Japan – part 1, 16 channel electroacoustic composition, 9:48 min CD
 2016 – voice – unrooted, for soprano and electronics, 16:00 min
 2017 – nighttime songs from afar, sound and light installation, 40:00 min
 2017 – virtual bodies, for piano and live-electronics, 13:30 min
 2018 – dark matter – avalanche, 24-channel electroacoustic composition, 14:45 min
 2018 – Linien Texturen, graphic score for 4 players + 8channel fixed media sounds, 16:00 min
 2018 – moments before the eruption, for seven instruments and electronics, 18:30 min
 2018 – percussion forest, for 16 computerized percussion mallets and 24 loudspeakers, 25:00 min
 2019 – Spannungsresonanzen, radio play, 8:30 min

Discography

9 Trajectoires, a CD box by Ina GRM 2018
Auf Abwegen, DegeM-CD15 2017
Firmament, empreintes DIGITALes 2015
Computer Music Journal Sound Anthology
30 Jahre InventionenICMC 2009CIMESP, 14th international Electroacoustic Music Contest of Sao PauloMusik in Deutschland 1950–2000, Deutscher MusikratMigration, Arizona University Recordings LLC, AUR CD 3134 2007Für kommende Zeiten, Ensemble für Intuitive Musik Weimar plays Karlheinz StockhausenDVD – 50 Jahre TU Studio BerlinKlangreise, Ensemble für Intuitive Musik Weimar (EFIM) 2004Computer Music Journal, volume 27, 200315.+16. Tage Dresdner Tage Zeitgenössischer MusikCompendium International, IMEB Bourges 2000Presence II, Productions électro Productions (PeP) 2000MOMENT, empreintes DIGITALes 2000eXcitations, empreintes DIGITALes 2000Prix Ars Electronica Linz, 1998Ausbruch Aufbruch, DegeM CD04 1998Prix International Noroit – Léonce Petitot, 1998electroNIquE, CD for the opening of the electronic studios at the University SingaporeCIMESP São Paulo, 1995Ausbruch der Klänge, Ensemble für Intuitive Musik Weimar in Mexico City 1994Stimmen...Klänge, DegeM CD01 1994

Further reading
 Paland, Ralph. 2006. "Tutschku, Hans". Die Musik in Geschichte und Gegenwart. 2nd ed., volume 16. Edited by Ludwig Finscher. Kassel, Stuttgart: Bärenreiter, Metzler. .
 ——. "Zwischen 'Untergang' und 'Hoffnung'. Zur Musik und kompositorischen Poetik von Hans Tutschku", Topographien der Kompositionsgeschichte seit 1950: Pousseur, Berio, Evangelisti, Kagel, Xenakis, Cage, Rihm, Smalley, Brümmer, Tutschku. Signale aus Köln. Beiträge zur Musik der Zeit, vol. 16. Edited by Tobias Hünermann and Christoph von Blumröder. Vienna 2011, .

External links
 
 Ketty Nez, "An Interview with Hans Tutschku", in the Computer Music Journal, 27:4, pp. 14–26, Winter 2003.
 Patricia Dirks Kitchener, Hans Tutschku: Moment (review), Computer Music Journal'', 25:4, p. 100 ff.
 

1966 births
Electroacoustic music composers
Harvard University faculty
German electronic musicians
German composers
Living people
Hochschule für Musik Carl Maria von Weber alumni
Radcliffe fellows